Animation is the interpolation of dissimilar frames over a finite period.

Animate may also refer to:

 Animate noun or animacy, a grammatical category
 Animate (retailer), a Japanese anime retailer
 "Animate" (song), by Rush
 "Animate", a song by Northlane from their 2015 album Node
 Adobe Animate, an animation program created by Adobe Systems

See also
Animism, the idea spirits exist in natural phenomena